The First Guesthouse is a historical building and former guesthouse of President Chiang Kai-shek in Magong City, Penghu County, Taiwan.

History
The beam raising ceremony was held on 26 October 1942 and the building construction was completed in February 1943. On 17 May 1949, former ROC President Chiang Kai-shek flew to Penghu for the very first time and stayed at the guesthouse, hence it became one of his long-term guesthouses and was later renamed to the First Guesthouse. The building was declared a historic monument on 10 December 1998. In 2009, it underwent restoration for the main architecture and was reopened to the public on 18 May 2011.

Architecture
The interior wall of the building was constructed by coral rock. There are many plants, trees and pavements on the courtyard as well. Additionally, there is huge grass plaza for star observation during the night.

See also
 List of tourist attractions in Taiwan
 Guesthouses of Chiang Kai-shek

References

External links

  

1943 establishments in Taiwan
Buildings and structures in Penghu County
Houses completed in 1943
Houses in Taiwan